Septimus Alfred Stephen (8 May 1842 – 28 August 1901), generally referred to as S. A. Stephen, was an Australian politician, solicitor and founding member of the law firm Stephen, Jaques and Stephen.

The Stephen family is a prominent legal dynasty in Australia. He was born in Sydney, the seventh son of Sir Alfred Stephen  (1802–1894), who would later become Chief Justice of NSW and Lieutenant-Governor of NSW, and his second wife Eleanor Martha . 
He was educated at Rev. W. H. Savigny's school and in 1858 became a solicitor's clerk, serving his articles with his brother Montagu Consett Stephen. He qualified as a solicitor in 1864 and went into partnership with his brother as Stephen and Stephen, later to become Stephen, Jaques and Stephen. In 1882 he was elected to the New South Wales Legislative Assembly for Canterbury, serving until his appointment to the Legislative Council in 1887. He was severely affected by the 1890s drought, which damaged many of his investments in Queensland. He resigned from  the Legislative Council in 1900 and died at East Woodhay in Hampshire the following year.

References

 

1842 births
1901 deaths
Members of the New South Wales Legislative Assembly
Members of the New South Wales Legislative Council
19th-century Australian politicians